23 Walks is a 2020 British romantic comedy-drama film written and directed by Paul Morrison. It stars Alison Steadman, Dave Johns and Graham Cole. It was released on 30 July 2020 in New Zealand and is scheduled to release on 25 September 2020 in the United Kingdom.

Cast
 Alison Steadman as Fern
 Dave Johns as Dave
 Graham Cole as Jimmy
 Bob Goody as George
 Marsha Millar as Marcy
 Oliver Powell as Saul
 Natalie Simpson as Donna
 Vivienne Soan as Chaplin
 Rakhee Thakrar as Registrar

Release
The film was released to theatres on 30 July 2020 in Australia, and it was released on 25 September 2020 in the United Kingdom.

Reception
Critics generally praised the film, while others panned the script and dialogue. The Sydney Morning Herald  praised Steadman's acting, saying "Her performance is a masterclass in the art of elevating a mediocre script" and that "she is the factor that makes 23 Walks something other than a dead loss" Subculture Media called it a "brilliantly written film that packs quite a punch as it explores social topics that many other films would shy away from", labelling it "one of the best screenplays of 2020". Others named it an "incredibly sweet film".

References

External links
 

2020 films
2020 romantic comedy-drama films
2020s English-language films
British romantic comedy-drama films
Films directed by Paul Morrison (director)
2020s British films